OPLA is an abbreviation that can refer to:

 Allama Iqbal International Airport in Lahore, Pakistan
 Organization for the Protection of the People's Struggle, a 1940s Communist urban guerrilla group in Greece.